Stephen Christopher Yaxley-Lennon (born 27 November 1982), better known as Tommy Robinson, is a British far-right, Islamophobic activist, and convicted criminal on multiple counts of violence and fraud as well as other crimes. He is the co-founder and former leader of the English Defence League, and later served as a political advisor to former UKIP leader Gerard Batten.

Robinson has been active in far-right politics for many years. He was a member of the neo-fascist and white nationalist British National Party (BNP) from 2004 to 2005. For a short time in 2012, he was joint vice-chairman of the British Freedom Party (BFP). Robinson led the EDL from 2009 until 8 October 2013. He continued as an activist, and in 2015 became involved with the development of Pegida UK, a now defunct British chapter of the German-based far-right organisation Pegida. From 2017 to 2018, Robinson wrote for and appeared in online videos for Rebel News, a Canadian far-right political website.

Robinson has a long-standing criminal record. His convictions include for violence, stalking, financial and immigration frauds, drug possession and public order offences. He has been committed to prison for contempt of court. He has served at least four separate terms of imprisonment: in 2005 for assault, in 2012 for using false travel documents to enter the United States, in 2014 for mortgage fraud, and, in May 2018, Robinson was committed to prison for 13 months  for contempt of court after publishing a Facebook Live video of defendants entering a law court, contravening a court order that disallows reporting on such trials while proceedings are ongoing. On 1 August 2018, due to procedural errors, he was released on bail pending a new hearing of the case. On 5 July 2019, Robinson was again found guilty of contempt of court at the retrial and was committed at the Old Bailey to nine months in prison on 11 July․ Before his sentencing, Robinson appeared on InfoWars and appealed for political asylum in the United States. He was released from prison on 13 September 2019 after serving 9 weeks.

On 22 July 2021, Robinson was found to have libelled a 15-year-old refugee at a school in Huddersfield and was ordered to pay £100,000 plus legal costs, although Robinson had filed for bankruptcy in March 2021. In October 2021, he was made subject to a five-year stalking order for harassing the journalist Lizzie Dearden and her partner.

Name 
Robinson's birth name is Stephen Christopher Yaxley. The name Tommy Robinson is a pseudonym taken from a prominent member of the "Men In Gear" (MIG) football hooligan crew, which follows Luton Town Football Club.  The nom de guerre successfully hid Robinson's identity as Stephen Yaxley-Lennon and his criminal history, until the connection was uncovered in July 2010 by Searchlight magazine.

Robinson has also used the names Andrew McMaster, Paul Harris, Wayne King, and Stephen Lennon.

Early life 
Robinson was born Stephen Christopher Yaxley in Luton, England. In an interview with Victoria Derbyshire on BBC Radio Five live in 2010, he said that his parents "were Irish immigrants to this country". His mother, who worked at a local bakery, remarried when Robinson was still young; his stepfather, Thomas Lennon, worked at the Vauxhall car plant in Luton.

According to Robinson, after leaving school he applied to study aircraft engineering at Luton Airport: "I got an apprenticeship 600 people applied for, and they took four people on." He qualified in 2003 after five years of study, but then lost his job when he was convicted of assaulting an off-duty police officer in a drunken argument. He served a 12-month prison sentence.

Robinson joined the far-right and fascist political party British National Party (BNP), then led by Nick Griffin, in 2004. When questioned about this by the journalist Andrew Neil in June 2013, he said that he had left after one year, stating he did not know Nick Griffin was in the National Front and did not know that non-whites could not join the organisation. Robinson said, "I joined, I saw what it was about, it was not for me."

Robinson was involved with the group United Peoples of Luton, formed in response to a March 2009 protest against Royal Anglian Regiment troops returning from the Afghan War being attacked by the Islamist groups Al-Muhajiroun and Ahlus Sunnah wal Jamaah.

English Defence League 

Robinson founded the English Defence League (EDL) in 2009 with his cousin Kevin Carroll, and became its leader with Carroll as deputy leader. Robinson stated that he had been prompted to found the EDL after he had read a newspaper article about local Islamists attempting to recruit men outside a bakery in Luton to fight for the Taliban in Afghanistan.  Robinson has appeared masked at protests. Although Robinson repeatedly insisted from the early days of the organisation that the EDL was "against the rise of radical Islam" and that its members "aren't against Islam", its rank and file were noted for including football hooligans and members who described themselves as anti-Muslim. Robinson founded the European Defence League, a co-ordination of groups similar to the EDL operating in different European countries.

Robinson's identity as Stephen Yaxley-Lennon was unmasked by Searchlight magazine in July 2010.  Yaxley-Lennon's prior criminal history was thereby connected with Robinson.

Robinson was assaulted on 22 December 2011. He said this occurred after stopping his car due to another car flashing its lights at him, and that a group of three men attacked and beat him, until they were stopped by the arrival of a "good Samaritan". Robinson said that the attackers were of Asian appearance. Bedfordshire Police stated that it was "unclear what the motive for the attack was".

Robinson was convicted in 2011 of using "threatening, abusive or insulting behaviour" during a fight between supporters of Luton Town and Newport County in Luton the previous year. Robinson reportedly led the group of Luton fans, and played an integral part in starting a 100-man brawl, during which he chanted "EDL till I die". He was sentenced to a 12-month community rehabilitation order with 150 hours' unpaid work and a three-year ban from attending football matches.

Robinson was arrested again after an EDL demonstration in Tower Hamlets in September 2011 for breach of bail conditions, as he had been banned from attending that demonstration. Robinson later began a hunger strike while on remand in HM Prison Bedford, saying that he was a "political prisoner of the state", and refused to eat what he believed was halal meat. A handful of EDL supporters protested outside the prison in support of Robinson during his incarceration; the support peaked at a turnout of 100 protesters on 10 September. Robinson was released on bail on 12 September.

On 29 September 2011, Robinson was convicted of common assault after headbutting a fellow EDL member at a rally in Blackburn in April that year. He was sentenced to 12 weeks' imprisonment, suspended for 12 months.

On 8 November 2011, Robinson held a protest on the rooftop of the FIFA headquarters in Zürich against FIFA's ruling that the England national football team could not wear a Remembrance poppy symbol on their shirts. For this he was fined £3,000 and jailed for three days.

In 2012, Robinson announced that he had joined the British Freedom Party (BFP). He was appointed its joint vice-chairman along with Carroll after the EDL and the BFP agreed an electoral pact in 2011. However, on 11 October 2012, Robinson resigned from the BFP to concentrate on EDL activities. The same year, he was described as one of the counter-jihad network's most influential figures.

Leaving the EDL 
In April 2012, Robinson took part in a programme in the BBC's television series The Big Questions in which far-right extremism was debated. Mo Ansar, a British Muslim political and social commentator, took part in the same programme, and invited Robinson to join him and his family for dinner. This resulted in several meetings over the next 18 months between Robinson and Ansar to discuss Islam, Islamism and the Muslim community, accompanied by a BBC team which created the documentary When Tommy Met Mo. On 8 October 2013, Quilliam held a press conference with Robinson and the EDL's deputy leader Kevin Carroll to announce that Robinson and Carroll had left the EDL. Robinson said that he had been considering leaving for a long time because of concerns over the "dangers of far-right extremism". Robinson said: "I acknowledge the dangers of far-right extremism and the ongoing need to counter Islamist ideology not with violence but with better, democratic ideas". Ten other senior figures left the EDL with Robinson and Carroll, and Tim Ablitt became the EDL's new leader.

When Robinson was questioned by The Guardian about having blamed "'every single Muslim' for 'getting away' with the 7 July bombings, and for calling Islam a fascist and violent religion, he held up his hands and said, 'I'm sorry, I'm sorry.'" Robinson also said that he would now give evidence to the police to help in their investigation of racists within the EDL. Robinson added that "his future work would involve taking on radicalism on all fronts". Robinson said in his autobiography that he was paid £2,000 per month for Quilliam to take credit for his leaving the EDL, which a Quilliam spokesperson denied.

Hearts of Oak 

In February 2020, Robinson, Carl Benjamin (also known as "Sargon of Akkad") and other former UKIP members launched the far-right organisation Hearts of Oak. At its launch, the members said that it is not a political party but a "cultural movement", whose key issues include "strong borders, immigration and national identity", "authorities privileging and protecting Islam alone" and "freedom of speech". Other contributors to Hearts of Oak include Dr Niall McRae, the co-author of an Islamophobic and anti-Semitic conspiracy booklet, and Catherine Blaiklock, the former leader of the Brexit Party.

Hearts of Oak's address is 71-75 Shelton Street. Vice World News found eight separate companies currently or formerly run from that address whose directors are members of the Orthodox Conservatives, the Bow Group or Turning Point UK.

Spotify has been criticised for distributing podcasts by Hearts of Oak, whose guests have included Lutz Bachmann, the founder of the far-right anti-Islam Pegida movement, as well as Robinson and Benjamin.

Robinson and Benjamin pre-recorded a speech that was displayed at a protest on 1 August 2020 demanding the deportation of the men involved in the Rochdale child sex abuse ring. Richard Inman, the founder of Veterans Against Terrorism, a campaign group with far-right associations, was also a speaker and demanded the death penalty, stating "this rape epidemic" is "carried out by one section of the community", referring to Muslim Pakistani men. However, a 2011 government report showed that almost 85% of men found guilty of sexual activity with a minor in England and Wales were white.

Antifacist counter-protestors produced a leaflet that said, "Hearts of Oak are ideologically based on Islamophobia, racism and nationalism. By focusing only on sexual attacks by Muslims, they dismiss all other sexual attacks by men who are not Muslims. Singling out one group of people as the sole perpetrators of sexual crimes is a lie and it is racist. Focusing exclusively on sexual crimes and violence against women committed by Muslims is sexist, as it deliberately forgets all the other victims of sexual crimes and violence against women." As the protest finished, Stand Up to Racism tweeted, "Several speakers didn't show & the 'highlight' of Tommy Robinson's video message went down poorly […] Hearts of Oak are going nowhere."

On 18 September 2022, Standing For Women, founded by Kellie-Jay Keen-Minshull held a rally in Brighton. Hearts of Oak attended and live-streamed from the front of the inner circle at the rally.

Later activities 
Robinson spoke at the Oxford Union on 26 November 2014. Unite Against Fascism (UAF) protested against his appearance, criticising the Union for allowing him the platform when, according to UAF, he had not renounced the views of the EDL. Robinson told the audience he was not allowed to talk about certain issues because he was out on prison licence. He said, "I regain my freedom of speech on the 22 July 2015." He criticised "politicians, the media and police for failing to tackle certain criminal activities because of the fear of being labelled Islamophobic." He said that Woodhill prison had become "an ISIS training camp", and that radicals were "running the wings".

After release from licence at the end of his sentence, Robinson returned to anti-Islam demonstrations with Pegida UK, a British offshoot of Pegida, a German anti-immigration organisation founded in Dresden amid the European migrant crisis. Addressing a Pegida anti-Islam rally in October 2015, Robinson spoke out against what he perceived to be the threat of Islamist terrorists posing as refugees. He announced the creation of a "British chapter" of Pegida in December 2015. He said that alcohol and fighting would not be permitted because "It's too serious now for that stuff", and told The Daily Telegraph that a mass demonstration would take place across Europe on 6 February 2016. On 14 February 2016, Robinson was attacked and treated at a hospital after leaving a nightclub in Essex.

Robinson wrote an autobiography, Enemy of the State, which was self-published in 2015.

Robinson travelled to watch UEFA Euro 2016 in France and demonstrated with a T-shirt and English flag ridiculing the Islamic State of Iraq and the Levant (ISIL). Bedfordshire Police imposed a football banning order on him on his return; his solicitor Alison Gurden accused the police of equating the proscribed terrorist group with all Muslims in their action. In September, a judge at Luton Magistrates' Court dismissed the case, calling the prosecution's evidence "vague" and "cagey".

On 27 August 2016, 18 Luton Town football supporters, including Robinson and his family, were ejected by police from a Cambridge pub on the day of the Cambridge United versus Luton football match. Robinson claimed he had been victimised, and complaints were submitted to Cambridge Police. In March 2019, at Peterborough County Court, Robinson accused Cambridgeshire Constabulary of harassment, direct discrimination, humiliation, stress, anxiety, and breach of human rights namely, the right to family life, right to freedom of conscience or religion and freedom of expression. The claims related to police behaviour around Robinson's possibly being issued a section 35 dispersal order at the pub after the match in 2016. The court rejected Robinson's claims and ordered him to pay £20,000 towards costs. Robinson said he would appeal against the ruling.

Robinson was a correspondent for Rebel News, a Canadian far-right website. In May 2017, he was arrested for contempt of court after he attempted to take video of the defendants in an ongoing rape trial outside Canterbury Crown Court.

Robinson's second self-published book,  Mohammed's Koran: Why Muslims Kill For Islam was co-authored with Peter McLoughlin and released in 2017. Amazon has refused to sell it.

Robinson was involved in a fist fight at Royal Ascot later in June 2017, for which Piers Morgan criticised him on Twitter.

In March 2018, Robinson attended court in support of Mark Meechan, who had been charged for a hate crime after posting footage online of a dog performing Nazi salutes in response to the phrases "gas the Jews" and "Sieg Heil". Meechan was found guilty because the video was "antisemitic and racist in nature" and was aggravated by religious prejudice. Meechan said that the video was taken out of context and was a joke to annoy his girlfriend.

In response to the Telford child sexual exploitation scandal, Robinson held a January 2022 protest in Telford, during which he screened his 73-minute documentary about Muslim grooming gangs, titled The Rape of Britain: Survivor Stories.

Communication with Finsbury Park terrorist attack perpetrator 
It was revealed in court that the perpetrator of London's 2017 Finsbury Park mosque terrorist attack received emails from Robinson and read Robinson's tweets in the lead-up to the attack. Robinson's tweet mocking people for responding to terrorism with the phrase "don't look back in anger" was found in the note at the scene of the attack. An email from Robinson's account to the attacker Darren Osborne shortly before read, "Dear Darren, you know about the terrible crimes committed against [name redacted] of Sunderland. Police let the suspects go… why? It is because the suspects are refugees from Syria and Iraq. It's a national outrage…" Another email read, "There is a nation within a nation forming just beneath the surface of the UK. It is a nation built on hatred, on violence and on Islam."

Robinson responded on Twitter to the Finsbury Park attack, writing, "The mosque where the attack happened tonight has a long history of creating terrorists & radical jihadists & promoting hate & segregation," and, "I'm not justifying it, I've said many times if government or police don't sort these centres of hate they will create monsters as seen tonight." Robinson's statements were widely criticised in the media as inciting hatred. Appearing the next morning on Good Morning Britain, Robinson held up the Quran and described it as a "violent and cursed book". The host, Piers Morgan, accused him of "stirring up hatred like a bigoted lunatic", and Robinson's appearance drew a number of complaints to Ofcom.

Commander Dean Haydon of Scotland Yard's counter-terrorism command said that online material from Robinson had played a "significant role" in how Osborne was radicalised and "brainwashed". Mark Rowley, the outgoing Assistant Commissioner of the Metropolitan Police and the UK's most senior counter-terror officer said that there is "no doubt" that material posted online by people including Robinson drove the Finsbury Park terror attacker to targeting Muslims. In response, Robinson said: "I'm gonna find Mark Rowley."

Almondbury Community School assault and legal action against Robinson 

After a Syrian refugee boy was assaulted in a school bullying incident in October 2018, Robinson falsely accused the victim of having previously attacked two schoolgirls. The 15-year-old refugee was dragged to the floor by his neck and told by his attacker, "I'll drown you", while water was forced into his mouth. The boy's arm was in a cast after it had been broken in a separate assault. His sister had also been assaulted.

A 16-year-old boy believed to be the attacker, who was interviewed by police and given a court summons, had shared numerous social media posts by Robinson. On Facebook, Robinson subsequently posted a screenshot of a message from a mother saying her daughter had been bullied and he accused the refugee of being the bully. However, the mother responded on Robinson's Facebook page informing him this was false. Robinson also made a false allegation using a photo stolen from a news article on a teenage cancer patient.

These events forced the refugee's family to relocate because "the level of abuse the children have received has become too much". The family decided to move elsewhere in West Yorkshire. Robinson may have breached court orders preventing the naming of the alleged perpetrator in several videos on Facebook and Instagram, including one that was viewed more than 150,000 times. A lawyer said in doing so Robinson had "compounded" the refugee's suffering, adding "many people on social media having viewed Mr Yaxley-Lennon’s [Robinson's] lies believed them and expressed their outrage toward [the refugee]."

In January 2019, the refugee said returning to Almondbury Community School was still too dangerous. He described living in fear after Robinson's postings because "there are people who hang around outside my house and video me on their phones. They call me 'little rat' if I go outside. One of my neighbours threatened me outside my house just yesterday." His lawyers said Robinson's postings had made him "the focus of countless messages of hate and threats from the extreme right wing" and had led to a police safety warning.

After receiving a letter from lawyers representing the refugee boy's family, pointing out that the videos Robinson had posted "contain a number of false and defamatory allegations", Robinson admitted to his followers that it was fake news and said that he had been duped: "I have been completely had, how embarrassing man." Robinson deleted the videos and admitted to posting a fake photograph purporting to show violence by a Muslim gang. He was warned about legal action for defamation. In response to allegations from Robinson's supporters that this warning "blocked" free speech, the boy's lawyer said, "Tommy Robinson thinks it is a good idea to defame this 15-year-old boy and accuse him of being the author of his own bullying. It is actually sickening." On 15 May 2019, the boy's lawyer said that his client was suing Robinson for "defamatory comments" Robinson had made.

It was reported that Facebook protected prominent figures such as Robinson from the normal rules of moderation that would usually see a page removed after posting content that violates its rules. Solicitors representing the victim are pursuing legal action against the social media firm on the basis Facebook was responsible for Robinson's posts as it had given him "special treatment [that] seems to be financially driven".  However, on 26 February 2019, Facebook announced that it had banned Robinson from the service for violating its community standards and "posting material that uses dehumanizing language and calls for violence targeted at Muslims". It also cited violations of policies concerning "organized hate".

On 22 July 2021, Robinson was found to have libelled the boy and was ordered to pay £100,000 plus legal costs, which are understood to amount to a further £500,000. An injunction was also granted to stop Robinson from repeating the libel. Robinson, who represented himself during the four-day trial, said he was "gobsmacked" by the costs the victim's lawyers were claiming, which he said included £70,000 for taking witness statements. He added: "I've not got any money. I'm bankrupt. I've struggled hugely with my own issues these last 12 months ... I ain't got it." In January 2022, an independent insolvency expert was appointed by Robinson's creditors (who include the schoolboy and the boy's lawyers – owed an estimated £1.5m in legal costs) to find any assets or money that Robinson could be hiding.

Other social media activity 
In March 2018, Robinson was permanently banned from Twitter for violating its rules on "hateful conduct". In January 2019, YouTube announced that it had removed adverts from Robinson's account, saying that he had breached the site's guidelines. Also in January 2019, Robinson livestreamed himself causing a lockdown, by leading a group that surrounded a library where the Glasgow South MP, Stewart McDonald, was holding a surgery. The group included the convicted armed kidnapper Daniel Thomas. The library was reportedly bombarded with phone calls. McDonald was eventually escorted away by police and he said the group blocked emergency exits.

In February 2019, using his Facebook account, Robinson wrote "I guess it's ok to rape white women then?" next to a Rape Crisis flyer about specialist services for ethnic minority victims, resulting in hundreds of racist and abusive phone calls to the centre from Robinson's supporters. The centre, which was providing support for rape victims of all ethnic backgrounds, condemned Robinson's post for "disrupting much-needed service provision for victims and survivors of sexual violence and abuse of all ethnicities and backgrounds". The centre included specialised services for ethnic minorities because "some groups of women who have survived sexual violence and abuse can face additional barriers to accessing services, including related to language and to the fear and/or past or current experience of racism and racial discrimination".

In February 2019, Facebook and Instagram banned him from their platforms citing violations of their hate speech rules including "calls for violence targeted at Muslims". Facebook subsequently placed him on its list of "Dangerous Individuals".

On 4 March 2019, at 11pm, Robinson arrived uninvited outside the home of a journalist who covers far-right issues and attempted to intimidate him. Robinson revealed the journalist's address on a livestream and threatened to reveal the addresses of other journalists. He left after police arrived, but returned at 5am. Robinson said this was an act of retaliation for having been served a legal letter at his parents-in-law's home, an act which he said was videoed and which he described as harassment. Robinson gave no indication that the journalist he attempted to intimidate had been involved in that alleged act. The journalist said the letter had been given to a police officer 50 metres from the house in question.

In April 2019, YouTube restricted Robinson's account due to its "borderline content", placing its content "behind an interstitial [warning page], removed from recommendations, and stripped of key features including livestreaming, comments, suggested videos, and likes".

On 5 April 2019, Snapchat terminated Robinson's account for violating their community guidelines, which prohibit hate speech and harassment.

In January 2020, Robinson was given the International Free Press award, also known as the Sappho Prize, described as an award given to journalists who combine excellence in their work with courage and a refusal to compromise. The International Free Press Society is closely connected to the counterjihad movement and Liz Fekete, the executive director of the Institute of Race Relations in Britain, has suggested that it is an instrument for pushing the boundaries of hate speech.

On 1 November 2020, Robinson was arrested at Speakers' Corner in Hyde Park, London, for breaking COVID-19 rules.

Political activities 
From 2004 to 2005, Robinson was a member of the far-right British National Party (BNP).

In September 2018, Robinson expressed a desire to join the UK Independence Party (UKIP). On 23 November 2018, UKIP leader Gerard Batten  appointed Robinson as his own advisor. In response, the former UKIP leader Nigel Farage described Robinson as a "thug" and said he was heartbroken with the direction UKIP was going. Farage and a Welsh Assembly member called for Batten to be removed as leader. At a UKIP meeting on 30 November, Robinson sat with Daniel Thomas, a convicted kidnapper.

Many prominent UKIP members, including eight of its MEPs, resigned from the party in response to Robinson's appointment. Of the eight MEPs who left, two were former party leaders. One was the UKIP's leader in Scotland; and another was Nigel Farage, who said Robinson and his associates brought "scuffles" and "violence" into the party and "many have criminal records, some pretty serious".

UKIP's rules deny membership to those who have been part of extreme right-wing groups in the past: these preclude Robinson from joining, as he founded the English Defence League (EDL), had been a member of the British National Party, and has had ties with the British Freedom Party. UKIP's National Executive Committee considered waiving that clause for Robinson as a special case. If approved, his possible membership would be put to a vote at the party's conference. UKIP leader Batten supported Robinson joining the party, while UKIP Welsh Assembly members Michelle Brown and David Rowlands said they opposed it.

On 25 April 2019, Robinson announced that he would be an independent candidate in the May 2019 European Parliament election in North West England. It was reported Anne Marie Waters, leader of the far-right For Britain party, promised Robinson the support of her party. Two people were hospitalised when Robinson campaigned as an MEP candidate in Warrington, Cheshire on 2 May. His security team and supporters physically attacked anti-racism activists, with one anti-racism activist saying she suffered a broken nose. Police launched an investigation into the violence. Robinson finished eighth in the election with 38,908 votes (2.2%), widely described as "humiliating" in the media, and losing his deposit. He said he had faced a "near impossible task" in attempting to win a seat, as he was "unable to get across his message on social media platforms" after being banned by almost all such platforms. His reaction was to mock the idea of a People's Vote by joking about having another election.

Prior to the 2019 United Kingdom general election, Robinson endorsed Conservative Party leader Boris Johnson as Prime Minister. Following the election, he announced he had joined the party. However, this was denied by a Conservative MP and by the Conservative Party nationally. Scram:, a website that campaigns against Robinson and other figures it sees as promoting far-right politics, has also debunked the claim.

In May 2021, he attended a march in London in support of Israel.

Robinson has supported the soldiers involved in the Bloody Sunday massacre. He wore a badge saying, "I support soldiers A-Z" after "Soldier F" was to face charges for the murder of civilians.

Financial support 
Robinson has received in excess of £2m in donations and sponsorship, much of it from foreign sources.

In 2017, the American billionaire Robert Shillman funded a paid fellowship at the rightwing Canadian website Rebel Media, with Robinson receiving over $6,000 (£5,000) per month.

In 2018, Robinson received £2m in donations that were sought by opponents of his imprisonment.
In July 2018, Middle East Forum, a US think tank led by Daniel Pipes and described as "fomenting anti-Muslim sentiment", said it had been funding rallies in Robinson's support and paying legal costs in his appeal against his prison sentence.
He also received funding from the rightwing group Yellow Vest Australia.

For several months in late 2018, Robinson used Facebook's donations feature that was intended for charities to instead collect money for a new conspiracy theory website and to fund legal action against the British government in relation to his own prison treatment. Within hours of learning of the charity feature's misuse, Facebook removed the button from Robinson's page.

In November 2018, PayPal told Robinson that it would no longer process payments on his behalf, saying that "Striking the necessary balance between upholding free expression and open dialogue and protecting principles of tolerance, diversity and respect for all people is a challenge that many companies are grappling with today." Robinson described the decision as "fascism". The service said it cannot "be used to promote hate, violence, or other forms of intolerance that is discriminatory".

Contempt proceedings 
On 10 May 2017, Robinson was charged with contempt of court, and convicted. He had filmed inside Canterbury Crown Court and posted prejudicial statements calling the defendants "Muslim child rapists" while the jury was deliberating. Judge Heather Norton said Robinson used "pejorative language in his broadcast which prejudged the outcome of the case and could have had the effect of substantially derailing the trial". She added, "this is not about free speech, not about the freedom of the press, nor about legitimate journalism, and not about political correctness. It is about justice and ensuring that a trial can be carried out justly and fairly, it's about being innocent until proven guilty. It is about preserving the integrity of the jury to continue without people being intimidated or being affected by irresponsible and inaccurate 'reporting', if that's what it was". The court then wrongly stated that Robinson had been sentenced to three months' imprisonment, suspended for 18 months and entered that incorrect result in the court records. In law, he had been committed to prison for a period of three months but suspended that committal for eighteen months. That technical error, the distinction between committed to prison and sentenced to imprisonment was identified and corrected by the Court of Appeal. The incorrect result was reported in the press.

The ramifications of this technical error came into effect in 2018 when the suspended prison sentence was activated. Robinson was again found to be in contempt of court at Leeds, again wrongly given a sentence of imprisonment and the Canterbury suspended sentence activated. Both sentences were for the offence of contempt of court, which can include speeches or publications that create a "substantial risk that the course of justice in the proceedings in question will be seriously impeded or prejudiced". He was later released following a successful challenge to the court's sentencing procedure. A rehearing was ordered.

2018 imprisonment 
Robinson was jailed and later released in mid-2018 for almost collapsing the Huddersfield grooming gang trial.

On 25 May 2018, Robinson was arrested for a breach of the peace while live streaming outside Leeds Crown Court during the trial of the Huddersfield grooming gang on which reporting restrictions had been ordered by the judge. Following Robinson's arrest, Judge Geoffrey Marson QC issued a further reporting restriction on Robinson's case, prohibiting any reporting of Robinson's case or the grooming trial until the latter case was complete.

The reporting restriction with regard to Robinson was lifted on 29 May 2018, following a challenge by journalists. The media reported that Robinson had admitted contempt of court by publishing information that could prejudice an ongoing trial, and had been jailed for 13 months. Judge Marson sentenced Robinson to ten months for contempt of court and his previous three months' suspended sentence was activated because of the breach. Robinson's lawyer said that Robinson felt "deep regret" after comprehending the potential consequences of his behaviour. Having breached a temporary section 4 (2) order under the Contempt of Court Act 1981, Robinson was told that if a retrial had to be held as a result of his actions the cost could be "hundreds and hundreds of thousands of pounds". Dominic Casciani, the BBC's home affairs correspondent, said, "This is not some new form of censorship directed at Robinson. These are rules that apply to us all, equally. If he is unsure about that, he's now got time on his hands to read a copy of Essential Law for Journalists."

Response of supporters 

The jailing of Robinson drew condemnation from right-wing circles. The UK Independence Party leader Gerard Batten MEP expressed concern about the proceedings and the ban on reporting. Robinson attracted sympathy from several right-wing politicians in Europe, including the Dutch Party for Freedom leader Geert Wilders and the member of the German Bundestag for the far-right Alternative for Germany Petr Bystron.

On the weekends following Robinson's arrest, his supporters held rallies to show support. At a demonstration in London on 9 June, over 10,000 protesters blocked the roads around Trafalgar Square and some attacked police, injuring five officers. Demonstrators prevented a Muslim woman from driving a bus, performed Nazi salutes, threw scaffolding, glass bottles and street furniture at police, and damaged vehicles and buildings.

An online petition for his release had more than 500,000 signatures. The anti-fascist advocacy group Hope not Hate said its analysis showed that 68.1% of the signatures were from the UK, with 9.7% from Australia, and the remaining 9.3% from the US, Canada, Germany, France, New Zealand, Netherlands, Sweden and Ireland combined.

In mid–June Robinson was transferred from HMP Hull to HMP Onley, the prison with the highest Muslim population (30.4%) in the Midlands. Caolan Robertson, then Robinson's cameraman, spread false information substantially exaggerating the Muslim population of a prison to which Robinson was moved. Robertson told the InfoWars conspiracy theorist Alex Jones that Robinson's new prison was "about 71 per cent Muslim" and therefore "really, really, really disastrous". The former Breitbart editor Raheem Kassam tweeted it to his followers while falsely accusing the Home Secretary, Sajid Javid, of moving Robinson there. A Robinson supporter was subsequently jailed for posing threatening and abusive messages aimed at Javid, relating to Robinson.

In July 2018, Reuters reported that the United States Ambassador-at-Large for International Religious Freedom, Sam Brownback, lobbied the UK government on the treatment of Robinson. The Middle East Forum has also lobbied the United States government and provided financial aid for rallies and legal aid. The Middle East Forum donated $50,000 to his legal defence fund.

Appeal hearing 
Robinson lodged an appeal initially against the proceedings at Leeds but much later against convictions both at Canterbury and Leeds.  The Court of Appeal agreed to hear Robinson's appeal out of time because Robinson had been held in "effective solitary confinement", which had made it difficult for Robinson to have meetings with his lawyers. The matter came before the Lord Chief Justice and two others at the Court of Appeal on 18 July 2018. Robinson said that he had not admitted the charges at Leeds nor had he been given a chance to apologise. His lawyer said that his initial contempt hearing was flawed; the details of the charge were not clear. He argued that his sentence was unfair. The court issued its ruling on 1 August 2018. In essence, the appeal against the proceedings at Canterbury failed and the appeal in respect of the Leeds' proceedings succeeded.

The court analysed the differences that arise from a prison sentence for a criminal offence and those from committal to prison for contempt. Of the mistakes made at Canterbury, the Court of Appeal learnt that those representing Robinson had been aware of the procedural errors. "It lies ill in the mouth of an appellant to complain of the failure of the court below to follow the appropriate procedural steps when that failure was fully appreciated at the time and remained deliberately uncorrected for tactical reasons and collateral advantage." In respect of the Leeds contempt the court stated, "We are satisfied that the decision at Leeds Crown Court to proceed to committal to prison so promptly and without due regard for Part 48 of the Rules gave rise to unfairness. There was no clarity about what parts of the video were relied upon as amounting to contempt, what parts the appellant accepted through his counsel amounted to contempt and for what conduct he was sentenced."

It was ordered that the records of the Crown Court at Canterbury and at Leeds be amended to show that Robinson had been committed to prison for contempt of court, not sentenced to imprisonment. It was ordered the matter be reheard at the Old Bailey before the Recorder of London "as soon as reasonably possible." Robinson was released on bail.

Aftermath of imprisonment 
On 2 August 2018, Robinson was interviewed on Tucker Carlson Tonight. During the interview, Robinson mainly discussed his two months in prison. He said that he was initially put in HM Prison Hull, where he was treated well. He was then transferred to HM Prison Onley, where, he claimed, he was severely mistreated, including with solitary confinement. The prison service rejected his claims saying, "Mr Yaxley-Lennon [i.e. Robinson] was treated with the same fairness we aim to show all prisoners – he had access to visits, television and showers – and it is totally false to say he was held in 'solitary confinement, adding that he had been kept in a care and separation unit for 48 hours whilst an assessment was made of his safety.

In October 2018, further controversy arose after Robinson posted a joint photo with two dozen young British Army "recruits" as he described them. He also posted on his Facebook page a video of the occasion in which the soldiers allegedly cheered him shouting his name. The British Army launched an investigation into the matter, saying, "Far-right ideology is completely at odds with the values and ethos of the armed forces. The armed forces have robust measures in place to ensure those exhibiting extremist views are neither tolerated nor permitted to serve." The Government's lead counter-extremism commissioner praised the army's response, saying, "This is typical of the far right. They manipulate and exploit their way into the mainstream, often targeting the military and co-opting its symbols. Tommy Robinson's attention-seeking is cover for divisive anti-Muslim hatred that is causing real harm to individuals, communities and society in general."

Reporting restrictions were lifted on the three Huddersfield grooming gang trials after the jury reached a verdict in the final trial. The Yorkshire Evening Post explained that it abided by the temporary restrictions because "If we had reported on the first trial then jurors may have been swayed in the second trial – a defence lawyer would argue that their clients could not get a fair hearing ... the whole trial could have collapsed ... a judge may have had to rule that they could not get a fair trial and those girls would NEVER have seen the men brought to justice".

Also in October 2018, U.S. Republican Party congressman Paul Gosar and six other members of congress invited Robinson to speak at a private meeting at the U.S. Congress on 14 November 2018. The trip was to be sponsored by the Middle East Forum, which said it had provided Robinson with legal funds since his imprisonment. Robinson was not granted a visa for the trip.

On 23 February 2019, Robinson held a rally in MediaCityUK outside BBC's Salford, Greater Manchester offices to protest against BBC's investigative current affairs programme Panorama and its presenter John Sweeney. During the rally, Robinson launched his film Panodrama that was broadcast on a large screen to the protesters estimated to be 4000 people, showing undercover footage of Sweeney, filmed by Robinson's former aide Lucy Brown. UKIP leader Gerard Batten spoke in support during the rally. Robinson said the aim of the protest was to make a stand "against the corrupt media" and called for the BBC licence fee to be scrapped. Concurrently, about 500 people attended a counter-protest by anti-fascists. In response, the BBC made an announcement that it strongly rejects any suggestion that its journalism is biased. Confirming that an upcoming Panorama episode was being prepared to investigate Robinson and his activities, it added that all programmes the BBC broadcasts follow BBC's "strict editorial guidelines". Regarding some of Sweeney's remarks during Robinson's Panodrama film exposé,  the BBC announcement added: "Some of the footage which has been released was recorded without our knowledge during this investigation and John Sweeney made some offensive and inappropriate remarks, for which he apologises."

Robinson announced his plans to stand as an MEP in the 2019 European Union parliamentary elections on 23 May, for the north-west of England European Parliament constituency. Running as an independent, Robinson submitted all necessary documentation and paid the £5,000 deposit to be a candidate in the elections. Soon after announcing his run, Twitter suspended his newly established electoral campaign account, after it was reported as a new account creation by a banned user. Robinson received only 2.2% of the vote and lost his deposit as a result.

New trial 
Following court hearings on 27 September and 23 October, the case was referred to the Attorney General, Geoffrey Cox QC MP. Judge Nicholas Hilliard said the matter was so complex it needed further consideration, adding "all the evidence must be rigorously tested". The referral would allow witnesses to be cross-examined.

In March 2019, the attorney general decided that it was in the public interest to bring further proceedings against Robinson. A contempt conviction had been quashed by the court of appeal in August 2018 "over procedural failings" and Robinson had been freed on bail pending new proceedings at the Old Bailey. But Nicholas Hilliard, the Recorder of London had referred the case to the attorney general in October 2018 for further investigation. Cox acted on the referral and after further studies for five months, he decided to raise further proceedings against Robinson. He said about his action, "After carefully considering the details of this case, I have concluded there are strong grounds to bring fresh contempt of court proceedings against Stephen Yaxley-Lennon." He added, "As proceedings are now underway, it would not be appropriate to comment further and I remind everyone that it is an offence to comment on live court cases." The first hearing in this renewed case was due to take place at the High Court in London on 22 March 2019. Robinson reacted by alleging that this new procedure by the attorney general is part of "an ongoing state persecution of a journalist [Robinson], who exposes the [UK] government and establishment and all of their wrongs." Robinson could be sent to jail if he is found in contempt in this new trial. The preliminary hearing was later postponed "until sometime after 3 May".

On 5 July 2019, Robinson was again found guilty of contempt of court at the retrial on three different grounds, including breaching the reporting restriction.

Defence lawyers at the trial he was livestreaming from had applied for the jury to be discharged on the basis of having been prejudiced, within days of his video, which could have collapsed the trial, arguing:

It is inconceivable when you have 3.5 million hits on the internet that this information has not come to the attention of this jury. It is inconceivable that the jury have not been spoken to by others, whether they themselves were looking for the information matters or not.

Three days before his scheduled sentencing on 11 July, Robinson appeared on The Alex Jones Show on the right-wing conspiracy channel Info Wars to appeal for political asylum in the United States, saying:

I feel like I'm two days away from being sentenced to death in the U.K. for journalism. Today, I am calling on the help of Donald Trump, his administration and the Republican Party to grant me and my family political asylum in the United States of America. ... I beg Donald Trump, I beg the American government, to look at my case. I need evacuation from this country because dark forces are at work. ... This is a direct appeal on behalf of my family – we love the United States, I have no future here [in Britain]. The country has fallen.

Robinson said that British jails are controlled by jihadi gangs and he would be killed while in prison (the UK has no death penalty). Although Robinson has in the past been refused entry to the US, and was jailed in 2012 for using a friend's passport to enter the country, in October 2018 he was invited by Congressional Republicans to speak in Washington, but could not obtain a visa in time. President Trump's ambassador for international religious freedom, the former Senator Sam Brownback raised the issue of Robinson's imprisonment with the British government in 2018, and the president's son, Donald Trump Jr. has in the past tweeted in Robinson's support.

On 11 July 2019, Robinson was jailed for nine months at the Old Bailey. He described the sentence as an "absolute joke" and called for protests. Outside the court, some of his supporters booed and a crowd marched towards the building chanting "we want Tommy out"; some began pelting police with bottles and cans. Robinson had already served 69 days and would be required to serve about another ten weeks.

On 13 September 2019, Robinson was released from prison after serving nine weeks. Several days later, he said that he had spoken to Julian Assange in prison, and announced that he supported him.

Other criminal convictions 

Robinson's criminal record also includes convictions for violence, financial and immigration frauds, drug possession, and public order offences. He had previously served at least three separate custodial sentences: in 2005 for assault, in 2012 for using false travel documents, and in 2014 for mortgage fraud.

Assault 
In April 2005 at Luton Crown Court, Robinson was convicted of assault occasioning actual bodily harm and assault with intent to resist arrest against an off-duty police officer in July 2004. The officer had intervened in an argument in the street between Robinson and his then girlfriend, Jenna Vowles. In the struggle that followed, Robinson kicked the officer in the head as he laid on the ground. Robinson received sentences of 12 months and 3 months, which were served concurrently.

In September 2011, at Preston Magistrates' Court, Robinson was convicted of assault for headbutting a man in Blackburn on 2 April 2011. In November 2011, he was given a 12-week jail term, suspended for 12 months.

Public order offence 
In July 2011, at Luton and South Bedfordshire Magistrates' Court, Robinson was convicted of using threatening, abusive or insulting behaviour, for leading a group of Luton Town F.C. supporters into a brawl involving 100 people in Luton on 24 August 2010. He was sentenced to a 12-month community rehabilitation order, 150 hours of unpaid work and given a three-year football banning order.

False passport 
In October 2012, Robinson was arrested and held on the charge of having entered the United States illegally. Robinson pleaded guilty at Southwark Crown Court to using someone else's passport to travel to the United States in September 2012, and was sentenced in January 2013 to 10 months' imprisonment.

Robinson had used a passport in the name of Andrew McMaster to board a Virgin Atlantic flight from Heathrow to New York.  He had been banned from entering the US due to his criminal record. When he arrived at New York's JFK Airport, customs officials who took his fingerprints realised he was not McMaster. He was asked to attend a second interview but left the airport, entering the US illegally. He stayed one night and returned to the UK the following day using his own legitimate passport – which bears the name Paul Harris.

Judge Alistair McCreath told him: "What you did went absolutely to the heart of the immigration controls that the United States are entitled to have. It's not in any sense trivial."

He was released on electronic tag on 22 February 2013.

Mortgage fraud 
In November 2012, Robinson was charged with three counts of conspiracy to commit fraud by misrepresentation in relation to a mortgage application, along with five other defendants. He pleaded guilty to two charges and in January 2014 was sentenced to 18 months imprisonment.

Robinson's fraud amounted to £160,000 over a period of six months. Judge Andrew Bright QC described him as the "instigator, if not the architect" of a series of frauds totalling £640,000. "This was an operation which was fraudulent from the outset and involved a significant amount of forward planning." He described Robinson as a "fixer" who had introduced others to fraudulent mortgage broker Deborah Rothschild. Rothschild had assisted some defendants by providing fake pay slips and income details.

Robinson was attacked by several fellow prisoners in HM Prison Woodhill. Following news of the attack, Maajid Nawaz wrote to the Secretary of State for Justice, Chris Grayling, asking for Robinson's situation to be urgently addressed. Shortly after this incident, Robinson was moved to HM Prison Winchester. Robinson told Jamie Bartlett, a director of the think tank Demos: "In Woodhill, I experienced Islam the gang. [...] In Winchester, I have experienced Islam the religion." Robinson made friends with several Muslim prisoners, referring to them as "great lads [...] I cannot speak highly enough of the Muslim inmates I'm now living with". In June 2014, Robinson was released on licence. The terms of his early release included having no contact with the EDL until the end of his original sentence in June 2015. He was due to talk to the Oxford Union in October 2014, but was recalled to prison before the event for breaching the terms of his licence. He was ultimately released on 14 November 2014.

Stalking

On 17 January 2021, after 10pm, Robinson went to the home of Lizzie Dearden, a journalist with The Independent, and her partner, after Dearden asked for his comment for a story she was writing, about allegations that he had misused financial donations from his supporters.  He falsely accused the partner of being a paedophile, and threatened to return nightly. He was duly arrested over the incident. He further published photographs of the journalist's partner on his Telegram channel stating that "serious allegations" had been made about him. It was alleged he threatened the couple in an attempt to prevent the article from being published. Dearden's article was published on 18 March 2021. On 19 March, Robinson was issued with an interim stalking ban order. On 13 October 2021, Robinson was convicted at Westminster Magistrates' Court of stalking the couple, and was given a five-year ban from contacting them or referring to them.

Bankruptcy 
Before incurring an estimated £1.6 million in costs following the libel trial, Robinson filed for bankruptcy in March 2021, using the name Stephen Christopher Lennon. The official receiver was searching for concealed assets, including any which had been put into other people's names. Former employees have raised questions as to what happened to money raised to support him. He denies misusing funds. In January 2022, people owed money by Robinson (including the libeled schoolboy, the boy's lawyers, HMRC, a former business partner and the Borough of Barrow-in-Furness) appointed an independent insolvency expert in an attempt to recover their money before the deadline for claims in March 2022.

Personal life 
Robinson married Jenna Vowles in 2011 and is the father of three children. The couple divorced in February 2021. Before he was arrested in 2003, he was an apprentice aircraft engineer at Luton Airport. Around 2010, he owned a tanning salon in Luton.

References

External links 
 

1982 births
Living people
21st-century English criminals
British National Party people
British politicians convicted of fraud
Conservative Party (UK) people
Counter-jihad activists
Criminals from Bedfordshire
British critics of Islam
English activists
English Defence League
English far-right politicians
English fraudsters
English nationalists
English people convicted of assault
Right-wing populism in the United Kingdom
English people of Irish descent
Former hooligans
English people convicted of drug offences
People convicted of stalking
English prisoners and detainees
Islamophobia in the United Kingdom
Anti-Islam sentiment in the United Kingdom
People from Luton
Prisoners and detainees of England and Wales
Prisoners and detainees of Switzerland